KSV Klein-Karben is a German association football club from Karben, Hesse and is part of a larger sports club founded in 1890. The association also has departments for dance, gymnastics, model airplanes, skat, tennis, table tennis, volleyball, and youth.

History
Not an outstanding side, the club achieved promotion to the tier-four Landesliga Hessen-Süd in 1981 but lasted for only one season before going down again. It made a return to their level in 1984 and, this time, would play for 13 consecutive seasons there. For the most part, the side finished in the upper half of the table and, in 1997, a league championship earned it promotion to the Oberliga Hessen.

KSV played in the Oberliga for the next 13 seasons, until 2010. In this era, a league championship in 2000 came as an absolute highlight, but the side was not promoted to the Regionalliga Süd. For the most part, the club remained a solid performer in the league until 2010, when a 16th-place finish meant relegation to the Verbandsliga Hessen-Süd (VI), where it played until 2014. A last place in the league in 2014 meant another relegation for the club, now to the Gruppenliga. Following another relegation in 2014–15 the club did not field a senior team in the 2015–16 season.

The club plays its home matches in the Günter-Reutzel-Stadion (capacity 3,000, ~120 seats).

Honours
The club's honours:

League
 Oberliga Hessen (IV)
 Champions: 2000
 Landesliga Hessen-Süd (V)
 Champions: 1997
 Runners-up: 1992, 1995, 1996

Cup
 Hesse Cup
 Runners-up: 2007

Recent managers
Recent managers of the club:

Recent seasons
The recent season-by-season performance of the club:

 With the introduction of the Regionalligas in 1994 and the 3. Liga in 2008 as the new third tier, below the 2. Bundesliga, all leagues below dropped one tier. Also in 2008, a large number of football leagues in Hesse were renamed, with the Oberliga Hessen becoming the Hessenliga, the Landesliga becoming the Verbandsliga, the Bezirksoberliga becoming the Gruppenliga and the Bezirksliga becoming the Kreisoberliga.

References

External links
  (youth football)
 Official team site (sports club)
 KSV Klein-Karben at worldfootball.net
 Das deutsche Fußball-Archiv  historical German domestic league tables

Football clubs in Germany
Football clubs in Hesse
Association football clubs established in 1890
1890 establishments in Germany